The Jaguar R1 is the car with which the Jaguar Racing Formula One team competed in the 2000 Formula One season, and the first Jaguar-badged car after Ford's purchase of the Stewart team the previous year.

The car proved largely disappointing, despite flashes of promise.  It generally proved difficult to drive and suffered from an unreliable gearbox.  Eddie Irvine, the  championship runner-up, could only score 4 points, placing the team ninth overall in the Constructors' Championship.

The R1 was the last F1 car that Johnny Herbert raced; the experienced Englishman retiring at the end of the season.  It was also the car in which Luciano Burti made his race début.

Complete Formula One results
(key)

References

External links

Jaguar Formula One cars
2000 Formula One season cars